|}

The Red Mills Chase is a Grade 2 National Hunt chase in Ireland. It is run at Gowran Park in February, over a distance of 2 miles and 4 furlongs.
Between 1997 and 2002, the race was run over a distance of 3 miles.

Records
Most successful horse (2 wins):
 Bob Treacy -  1999, 2001 
 Rubi Light – 2011, 2012

Leading jockey  (3 wins):
 Ruby Walsh – Bob Treacy (1999), Moscow Express (2002), Ballycasey (2017)
 Paul Townend -  Champagne Fever (2015), Bachasson (2021), Melon (2022) 
 Rachael Blackmore - Monalee (2019), Chris’s Dream (2020), Janidil (2023) 

Leading trainer (7 wins):
 Willie Mullins-  Micko's Dream (2000), J'y Vole (2010), Champagne Fever (2015), Ballycasey (2017), Bachasson (2021), Melon (2022), Janidil (2023)

Winners since 1990

See also
 Horse racing in Ireland
 List of Irish National Hunt races

References 
Racing Post: 
, 

National Hunt races in Ireland
National Hunt chases
Gowran Park Racecourse